Kodchakorn Songsaengterm (nickname: Gookgiik; กุ๊กกิ๊ก) is a Thai actress under Channel 7.

Biography
Songsaengterm was born in Bangkok on August 21, 1992. She entered the showbiz after entering the Dream Star Search 2010 contest and received first runner-up.

Her role is known as a protagonist in Thai folklore dramas such as Krai Thong, Jao ying Tang On, Uttai Tawee, including baddie role or supporting actress in other genres. Songsaengterm had her first acting role in 2011 on Channel 7 to date.

She graduated from Sainampeung Under the Royal Patronage of Princess Petcharat Rajsuda Sirisopaphannawadee School, Khlong Toei and graduated with a bachelor's degree from the Faculty of Communication Arts, University of the Thai Chamber of Commerce.

Television Presenter (MC)

Television 
 20 : ทุกวัน เวลา น.-น. On Air ร่วมกับ

Online 
 2021 : GG CHANNEL EP.1 On Air YouTuber:GG Channel Gookgiik

References

External links
Official  twitter 

1994 births
Living people
Kodchakorn Songsaengterm
Kodchakorn Songsaengterm
Kodchakorn Songsaengterm
Kodchakorn Songsaengterm
Kodchakorn Songsaengterm
Kodchakorn Songsaengterm